ODEON Covent Garden is a four-screen cinema in the heart of London's West End. Formerly known as The Saville Theatre, a former West End theatre at 135 Shaftesbury Avenue in the London Borough of Camden. The theatre opened in 1931, and became a music venue during the 1960s. In 1970 it became the two cinemas ABC1 Shaftesbury Avenue and ABC2 Shaftesbury Avenue, which in 2001 were converted to the four-screen cinema Odeon Covent Garden.

History

Theatre years
The theatre was designed by the architect Sir Thomas Bennett, in consultation with Bertie Crewe, and opened on 8 October 1931, with a play with music by H.F. Maltby, For The Love Of Mike.

The interior was opulent, The Stage reviewed the new theatre on its openingThe stalls bar and saloon lounge adjoining, will please the public, special care has been exercised in their equipment and decoration. The bar, which has mural paintings by Mr A. R. Thompson, is 18 ft by 54 ft in front of the counters, while the lounge, which is also decorated by the same artist, is 42 ft by 40 ft. There is a sort of shopping arcade in and about the lounge, as in the up-to-date hotels, and it is quite big enough for tea dances or concerts. So comfortable, indeed, are the lounge and the bar at the Saville, that it is to be feared that something more than a warning bell will be necessary to clear them

The theatre was damaged by bombing in 1941, but reopened quickly allowing Up and Running by Firth Shephard to complete a run of 603 performances. In 1955, the interior was completely refurbished by Laurence Irving, and John Collins created a new mural for the stalls bar. In 1963, a musical adaption of the Pickwick Papers premièred on 4 July 1963, featuring Harry Secombe in his first role in a musical. It was a success, remaining in the West End for two years and going on to tour the US, with a run on Broadway.

Epstein years

Brian Epstein, manager of The Beatles and himself a former drama student, leased the theatre in 1965, presenting both plays (including works by Arnold Wesker) and rock and roll shows. The venue became notorious for its Sunday night concerts. During one by Chuck Berry, members of the audience stormed the stage and the police were called to clear the theatre.

Theatre Productions in 1965 included The Solid Gold Cadillac with Sid James and Margaret Rutherford.

The venue saw several appearances of The Jimi Hendrix Experience, notably in August 1967, after their mini US tour and their groundbreaking Monterey Pop Festival performance. The Move and Procol Harum also appeared on the bill. An eclectic mix of bands such as Nirvana, Cream, Fairport Convention, the Incredible String Band and The Bee Gees, also appeared there.

The Beatles used the Saville to make their "Hello, Goodbye" promo (an early music video) in November 1967, and on 8 December 1967, Yoko Ono performed her The Fog Machine: Music of the Mind there, which included a projection of her film Bottoms (Film No. 4) in the men's room during the concert. The Rolling Stones played two shows on 21 December 1969.

The theatre was sold in 1969, and returned to presenting theatrical productions and under the new management it presented the London première of The Resistible Rise of Arturo Ui, a production that brought Leonard Rossiter to public attention. The last play to be performed at the theatre was Enemy by Robert Maugham, opening for a short run in December 1969.

Cinema years

The Saville was taken over by ABC Theatres (owned by EMI) in 1970 and converted to a two screen cinema. The conversion was undertaken by William Ryder and Associates. It opened on 22 December 1970 with ABC1 seating 616, and ABC2 581. The stage area became administration offices and little of the original theatre internal structure remains. In 2001, the building was taken over by the Odeon cinema group and is now the four screen Odeon Covent Garden cinema.

The exterior of the theatre retains many of the original 1930s details, although the wrought iron arch window on the frontage has been replaced by glass blocks.

Saville Theatre productions
 For the Love of Mike (1931)
 Tell Her the Truth (1932) – musical
 He Wanted Adventure (1933)
 Jill Darling (1934) – musical
 Here Come the Boys (1946)
 Gay's the Word (1951) – musical
 Love From Judy (1952) - musical. The entire production was filmed with the original cast and aired on BBC on March 16, 1953. 
 The White Countess (1954) – Play
 Keep In A Cool Place (1954) – comedy by William P Templeton
 Valmouth (1959) – musical
 Zuleika (1957) – musical
 Expresso Bongo (1960) – Musical
 Progress to the Park (1960) – Play
 The Lord Chamberlain Regets . . . ! (1961) – Revue
 Photo Finish (1962) – Play
 Semi-Detached (1962) – Play
 Pickwick (1963) – musical
 The Solid Gold Cadillac (1965)
 Anything Goes (1969)
 Enemy (1969)

References

 Cinema Treasures — Odeon Covent Garden
 Guide to British Theatres 1750–1950, John Earl and Michael Sell pp. 139 (Theatres Trust, 2000)

External links

 History of the Saville Theatre With Images and original Programmes.

Theatres completed in 1931
Former theatres in London
Art Deco architecture in London
Odeon Cinemas
Grade II listed buildings in the London Borough of Camden